Chung (Cung) is an Eastern Beboid language of Cameroon.

Notes

References

Sources
 Blench, Roger, 2011. 'The membership and internal structure of Bantoid and the border with Bantu'. Bantu IV, Humboldt University, Berlin.

Beboid languages
Languages of Cameroon